Leslie Tonks (birth registered second ¼ 1942 in Pontefract district – 17 November 2017) was an English professional rugby league footballer who played in the 1960s and 1970s.

Playing career

Featherstone Rovers
Tonks made his début for Featherstone Rovers on Saturday 9 September 1961.

Tonks played  in Featherstone Rovers' 17-12 victory over Barrow in the 1966–67 Challenge Cup Final during the 1966–67 season at Wembley Stadium, London on Saturday 13 May 1967, in front of a crowd of 76,290. He also played  in Featherstone Rovers' 9-12 defeat by Hull F.C. in the 1969–70 Yorkshire County Cup Final during the 1969–70 season at Headingley Rugby Stadium, Leeds on Saturday 20 September 1969.

Hull KR
Tonks spent the 1970/71 season on loan to Hull Kingston Rovers, playing in two matches.

Return to Featherstone
Tonks' benefit season and testimonial match at the Featherstone Rovers took place during the 1972–73 season.

He played prop in the 33-14 victory over Bradford Northern in the 1972–73 Challenge Cup Final during the 1972–73 season at Wembley Stadium on Saturday 12 May 1973, in front of a crowd of 72,395, and also in the 9-24 defeat by Warrington in the 1973–74 Challenge Cup Final during the 1973–74 season at Wembley Stadium, London on Saturday 11 May 1974, in front of a crowd of 77,400, he is the only player to play in three Challenge Cup finals for Featherstone Rovers.

Wakefield Trinity
In September 1974, Tonks followed coach Peter Fox  and joined Wakefield Trinity. He retired after the 1975/76 season.

Representative honours
On 3 April 1965, Tonks played in the first ever Great Britain under-24 international match in a 17–9 win against France under-24's.

Honoured at Featherstone Rovers
Tonks is a Featherstone Rovers' Hall of Fame inductee.

Genealogical information
Tonks' marriage to Brenda (née Noble) was registered during fourth ¼ 1963 in Pontefract district. They had children; Alan Tonks (birth registered during third ¼  in Wakefield district), and Kay Lesley Tonks (birth registered during first ¼  in Pontefract district).

References

External links

Ian Tonks & Tony Tonks

1942 births
2017 deaths
English rugby league players
Featherstone Rovers players
Hull Kingston Rovers players
Rugby league players from Pontefract
Rugby league props
Wakefield Trinity players